Cootamundra West railway station is a heritage-listed former railway station on the Lake Cargelligo line at Cootamundra, Cootamundra-Gundagai Regional Council, New South Wales, Australia. The property was added to the New South Wales State Heritage Register on 2 April 1999.

History 
The station opened in 1911. The station has been closed since 1983 when passenger services along the branch were withdrawn, although freight service continues.

Description 
The station complex consists of a double-storey, type 11 brick station building and brick-faced platform dating from 1911 as well as a former refreshment room. It survives in good condition.

Heritage listing 
Cootamundra West is a major station building which was abandoned as a station because of the change of proposed route for the main southern line. It is one of the finest structures from the Edwardian period of railway building and is a good example of redundancy taking place not long after the time of construction. The station group are a strong element in the townscape and of high significance in the development and history of railway construction. The building was used for many years as offices after its original purpose was changed.

Cootamundra West railway station was listed on the New South Wales State Heritage Register on 2 April 1999 having satisfied the following criteria.

The place possesses uncommon, rare or endangered aspects of the cultural or natural history of New South Wales.

This item is assessed as historically rare. This item is assessed as scientifically rare. This item is assessed as arch. rare. This item is assessed as socially rare.

See also

References

Attribution

External links

Disused regional railway stations in New South Wales
Railway stations in Australia opened in 1911
Railway stations closed in 1983
New South Wales State Heritage Register
Articles incorporating text from the New South Wales State Heritage Register